Punctulini is a tribe of leafhoppers in the subfamily Deltocephalinae. Punctulini currently contains 3 genera and 5 species. It is most closely related to Vartini and Magnentiini within Deltocephalinae.

Genera 
There are currently 3 described genera in Punctulini:

 Hirsutula 
 Punctulus 
 Taveunius

References 

Deltocephalinae